Tipula varipennis is a species of fly in the family Tipulidae. It is found in the Palearctic.

References

External links
Images representing Tipula at BOLD

Tipulidae
Insects described in 1818
Nematoceran flies of Europe